Al-Risala al-Qushayriyya fi 'Ilm al-Tasawwuf, mostly known as al-Risala al-Qushayriyya (The Treatise of al-Qushayri), is one of the early complete manuals of the science of Sufism (tasawwuf in Arabic), written by the Shafi'i-Ash'ari scholar Abu al-Qasim al-Qushayri (d. 465/1074). It was written in 438/1045–6 and has been published in several editions and translated in various languages, including English, French, German, Persian, Turkish, and Urdu. It became the most widely disseminated handbook of Sufism in the Islamic world.

Purpose and authorship 
Al-Qushayri's goal was to show the compatibility between mystical teaching and mainstream Sunni Islam. The purpose of authoring the book was to provide a solid structure for Sufism, along with its terminology and principles, and to demonstrate the conformity of Sufi beliefs and practices with the norms of the Shari'a, and to show that the creed of the Sufis was identical to that of the Ahl al-Sunna (in its Ash'ari formulation).

Content 
The work is considered as an indispensable reference book for those who study and specialize in Islamic mysticism, since it combines the two genres of biographical hagiography and technical manual – a feature that no other text from the period displays.

The work may be divided as follows:
 Part one is 'On the Shaykhs of This Way. How Their Lives and Teachings Show Their Regard for the Divine Law', enumerated 83 Sufi saints who had "guarded and helped Islam with proofs of religion".
 Part two is an explanation of 28 expressions in use among the Sufis 'with a clarification of what is obscure in them'.
 Part three of al-Qushayri's epistle describes 40 stations and states, the penultimate of which is Sufism and the last of which is model behaviour (adab), the conduct and discipline of the Sufi in relation to his shaykh and associate Sufis.

Al-Qushayri took it as axiomatic that the beliefs of the Sufi shaykhs were "in agreement with Sunni teaching on questions of the fundamentals of faith (Usul al-Din)". In discussing a plethora of Sufi technical terms, unique to their spiritual vernacular, al-Qushayri also dedicates a section to a lucid and detailed account of mujahada (spiritual striving or jihad). Fittingly, al-Qushayri begins this entry by quoting the Qur'anic verse:  and following it with the hadith: 'A man asked, "What is the best form of jihad?" to which the Islamic prophet Muhammad replied, "To speak the truth in front of an oppressive ruler"'.

Al-Qushayri goes on to interweave a variety of pious dicta from a number of early spiritual authorities such as Ibrahim ibn Adham (d. 777), Abu Sulayman al-Darani (d. 830), Abu Yazid al-Bistami (d. 848), Dhu al-Nun al-Misri (d. 860), Sari al-Saqati (d. 867), Abu Hafs al-Haddad (d. between 869 and 874) and Abu al-Qasim al-Junayd (d. 910), as well as quotations from his own Sufi mentors, Abu 'Ali al-Daqqaq (d. 1015) and Abu 'Abd al-Rahman al-Sulami (d. 1021). Among the most concise and telling quotations is that of Abu 'Uthman al-Maghribi (d. 983), who is quoted as saying, "Whoever thinks that some aspect of the [spiritual] path (tariqa) will be opened to him or some facet of it revealed to him without spiritual struggle (mujahada), he is sadly mistaken".

Commentaries 
 Shaykh al-Islam Zakariyya al-Ansari (d. 926/1520) authored a commentary on al-Qushayri's treatise, entitled Ahkam al-Dalala 'ala Tahrir al-Risala.
 The Hanafi scholar Mulla 'Ali al-Qari (d. 1014/1606) have written a commentary on al-Qushayri's treatise in two volumes, according to 'Umar Rida Kahhala in his Mu'jam al-Muallifin.

Translations

English edition 
The book has been translated in English and published under the title:
 "Principles of Sufism", translated by Barbara R. von Schlegell with an introduction by Hamid Algar. First published in 1990.
 "Sufi Book of Spiritual Ascent" (Abridged Edition), translated by Rabia Harris, edited by Laleh Bakhtiar, published in 1997. The second edition of this book was published in 2001 under the title "The Risalah: Principles of Sufism".
 "Al-Qushayri's Epistle on Sufism", translated by Alexander D. Knysh, edited by Muhammad Eissa. First published in 2007.

German edition 

French edition 
The first French translation was by André Fontenay, and it was printed and published in 2016 under the title "Épître sur la science du soufisme."

Urdu edition 
The first Urdu translation was by Maulana Mohammad Irfan Beg Noori, and it was printed and published in 2000 under the title "Ruh-e-Tassawwuf" available at Darul Irfan, Aligarh,  UP, India.

Reception 
The work has garnered numerous plaudits. Alexander Knysh suggests that al-Qushayri is famous principally because of this mystical treatise and that it was "probably the most popular Sufi manual ever". Annemarie Schimmel concurs, holding that it "is probably the most widely read summary of early Sufism" and stressing that "it was analyzed in the West prior to most other books on Sufism". Heinz Halm, in his Encyclopaedia of Islam article, cherishes al-Qushayri's Risala as "a most important compendium of the principles and terminology of Sufism", where, in this work as elsewhere, al-Qushayri attempts to reconcile Sufi practices, held as suspect by so many of the 'ulama' (scholars of the religious and legal sciences), with the dictates of Islamic law.

See also 

 Kashf al-Mahjub
 The Beginning of Guidance
 The Revival of the Religious Sciences
 The Moderation in Belief
 List of Sunni books

References

External links 
 Al-Risala al-Qushayriyya on Goodreads — Goodreads.com
 Al-Qushayri's Epistle on Sufism — Goodreads.com
 Al-Qushayri's Epistle on Sufism — World Digital Library
 Selections from al-Qushayri's al-Risala al-Qushayriyya

Sufi literature
Sunni literature
Ash'ari literature
Kalam
Islamic theology books